The 721st Air Mobility Operations Group (721 AMOG) is a United States Air Force (USAF) unit assigned to the 521st Air Mobility Operations Wing, stationed at Ramstein Air Base, Germany.

History

The squadron was reactivated in 1977 to operate the Military Airlift Command (MAC) aerial port at Ramstein Air Base.  It serviced transient C-5 Galaxy and C-17 Globemaster transports at Ramstein, loading and unloading cargo and also received airlifted equipment and personnel for United States Army Europe (USAREUR) forces units in Germany.

In August 1983, the squadron expanded to group size and was assigned separate aerial port and maintenance squadrons to carry out its mission.  It was also assigned its first flying squadron, the 58th Military Airlift Squadron (MAS), which was assigned from the 322d Airlift Division. The assumption of the airlift mission was reflected when the group was redesignated the 608th Military Airlift Group.  The 10th MAS at Zweibrücken Air Base which operated C-23 Sherpa transports in support of USAFE's European Distribution System (EDS) was also reassigned from the 322d Airlift Division in 1984. The EDS was organized to give units in Europe a quicker way to receive small equipment items or supplies on a round-the-clock basis, without the expense of the larger cargo aircraft.  The group also supported Special Air Transportation of HQ USAFE executives with a fleet of light transport.  The 10th MAS was inactivated in 1991.

in 1992, USAF embarked on a major reorganization of its Major Commands.  In this reorganization, theater airlift was reassigned from the inactivating MAC.  The host 86th Fighter Wing at Ramstein became the 86th Wing and the 58th MAS was redesignated the 58th Airlift Squadron and assigned to the wing's 86th Operations Group. The 608th's mission became strategic airlift support once again as it was redesignated the 608th Airlift Support Group of Air Mobility Command (AMC).  However, its mission expanded to include support for all of Europe and it was assigned squadrons at Torrejon AB, Spain, and RAF Mildenhall, England.  In recognition of its responsibility to support not only airlift, but the air refueling mission of AMC, it became the 621st Air Mobility Support Group in 1994 and was renumbered the because USAF policy required subordinate support units numbers to reflect their parent organization's number and the group was assigned to Twenty-First Air Force.  It became the 721st Air Mobility Operations Group in 2001.

The group's Detachment 5 was located at Balad Air Base with a mission to recover and launch AMC aircraft transiting Balad, minimizing ground time to reduce exposure to enemy attacks, In 2008, AMC activated the 521st Air Mobility Operations Wing at Ramstein.  The 521st assumed the theater air mobility support mission and the squadrons of the 721st located away from Ramstein were reassigned to it,

Lineage
 Constituted as the 608th Military Airlift Group on 1 July 1983
 Activated on 1 August 1983
 Redesignated 608th Airlift Support Group on 1 June 1992
 Redesignated 621st Air Mobility Support Group on 1 July 1994
 Redesignated 721st Air Mobility Operations Group on 15 March 2001

Assignments
 322d Airlift Division, 1 August 1983
 Twenty-First Air Force (later 21st Expeditionary Mobility Task Force), 1 March 1992
 521st Air Mobility Operations Wing, 1 September 2008 – present

Stations
 Ramstein AB, West Germany (later Germany), 1 August 1983 – present

Subordinate Units
 10th Military Airlift Squadron, 15 March 1984 – 31 March 1991
 58th Military Airlift Squadron, 1 August 1983 – 1 June 1992
 608th Aerial Port Squadron, 1 August 1983 – 1 July 1992
 608th Consolidated Aircraft Maintenance Squadron (later 608th Maintenance Squadron), 1 August 1983 – 1 July 1994
 623d Air Mobility Support Squadron (later 623d Air Mobility Operations Squadron, 723d Air Mobility Squadron), 1 July 1994 – present
 625th Airlift Support Squadron (later 625th Air Mobility Support Squadron, 725th Air Mobility Squadron), 1 June 1992 – 1 September 2008
 Located at Torrejon Air Base, Spain.  Moved to Naval Station Rota Spain
 627th Airlift Support Squadron (later 627th Air Mobility Support Squadron, 627th Air Mobility Operations Squadron, 727th Air Mobility Squadron), 1 August 1993 – 1 September 2008
 Located at RAF Mildenhall, England
 779th Expeditionary Airlift Squadron unknown date (c.2002?) – inactivated 15 April 2006
 Ramstein Air Base, Germany

Aircraft
 C-12F, 1983–1992
 C-21, 1983–1992
 C-20, 1983–1992
 C-23A, 1983–1992
 C-135, 1983-1992

Awards and Campaigns

References

Notes

Bibliography

External links
 AMC stands up new en route structure wing in Europe (Retrieved 24 Oct 2012)

Groups of the United States Air Force
Military units and formations established in 1966